Corozal Bay is an electoral constituency in the Corozal District represented in the House of Representatives of the National Assembly of Belize since 2021 by Elvia Vega-Samos of the People's United Party (PUP).

Profile

The Corozal Bay constituency was one of 10 new seats created for the 1984 general election. By far the smallest of the four constituencies in the Corozal District geographically, Corozal Bay consists of most of the district's capital, Corozal Town.

Area Representatives

Elections

References

Belizean House constituencies established in 1984
Political divisions in Belize
Corozal Bay (Belize House constituency)
Corozal District